Tecmon or Tekmon was a city of Molossis in ancient Epirus, incorrectly called by Stephanus of Byzantium a city of Thesprotia, taken by Lucius Anicius Gallus, the Roman commander, in 167 BCE.

Its site is unlocated.

References

Populated places in ancient Epirus
Cities in ancient Epirus
Former populated places in Greece
Lost ancient cities and towns